Roddam is a village and mandal in Sri Sathya Sai district in the state of Andhra Pradesh in India.

Demographics 
According to Indian census, 2001, the demographic details of Roddam mandal is as follows:
 Total Population: 	68,903	in 9,631 Households
 Male Population: 	46,386   and Female Population: 	22,517
 Children Under 6 Yrs: 10,335	(Boys – 15,186 and Girls -	12,149)
 Total Literates: 37,670

Villages 
The following is the list of villages in Roddam mandal.
1: YT Reddy Palli,
2: M.Kothapalli (mulakalachruvu),
3: Naranagepalli,
4: Moparlapalli,
5: Thadngipalli,
6: Peddaguvvala Palli (Nandagokulam),
7: Gonimekala Palli,
8: Maruva Palli,
9: Doddagatta,
10: Reddy Palli,
11: Patharla Palli,
12: Chinnakodi Palli,
13: Peddakodi Palli,
14: Turakala patnam,
15: Kurla Palli,
16: Basine Palli,
17: Kandukurla Palli,
18: Lakkasani Palli,
19: Padamantur,
20: Cherukuru,
21: Chinnamanthur
22: Nalluru,
23: Kallu kunta,
24: Bucherla,
25: Cholemarri,
26: Peddipalli,
27: Sanipalle,
28: Boksam palli,
29: roddakampalli,
30: kottala,
31: gourajupalli,
32: maravapalli,
33: kogira,
34: rachuru,

Features 
 The population in this village is around 3,500 and having 2,200 voters.
 The major crops in this village are Ground nuts, onion, rice& silk

References 

Mandals in Sri Sathya Sai district
Mandal headquarters in Sri Sathya Sai district